The 1984 CONCACAF Champions' Cup was the 20th edition of the CONCACAF Champions' Cup, the annual international club association football competition held in the CONCACAF region (North America, Central America and the Caribbean). It determined that year's club champion in the CONCACAF region and was played from 15 March to 21 October 1984.

The teams were split in two zones, North/Central America and Caribbean, (as North and Central America sections combined to qualify one team for the final), each one qualifying the winner to the final tournament. The final was scratched and Violette were declared champions and became CONCACAF champion for the first time in their history after CD Guadalajara and New York Pancyprian-Freedoms were disqualified for their failure to agree on match dates. The Pancyprian-Freedoms had planned to host their leg of the North/Central American final at the Los Angeles Memorial Coliseum in early December, but the dates conflicted with the league schedules for Guadalajara.

North/Central American Zone

First round

 Byes: Puebla, Suchitepéquez, Comunicaciones, New York Pancyprian-Freedoms. 
 Byes to third round: Guadalajara and Vida (Panama did not enter the tournament).

Second round

1Sagrada Familia withdrew.

Third round

Fourth round

 Both clubs were disqualified after failing to agree on the dates for the matches.

Caribbean Zone

First round
The following clubs reportedly entered: Violette Saint George's Moulien Racing Rivière-Pilote Guayama Cruz Azul Sport Guyanais Defence Force
 Suriname did not enter as they were suspended by FIFA.

Matches and results are unknown.

 Both clubs were disqualified for late payment of the entry fee.

Second round

Other matches and results are unknown.

Third round

Other matches and results are unknown. 
 Results from 1st leg are in doubt.

Final series
The final series was scratched and Violette were awarded the championship after CD Guadalajara and New York Pancyprian-Freedoms were both disqualified for failing to agree on match dates.

Champion

References

1
CONCACAF Champions' Cup